Bada, Davangere is a village in Davangere district, Karnataka, India. It was affected by the 2008 attacks on Christians in southern Karnataka.

Villages in Davanagere district